Helge Klæstad (6 December 1885 – 23 May 1965) was a Norwegian judge.

He was born in Levanger. He took the dr.juris degree in 1921, and was a Supreme Court Justice from 1929 to 1946, except for the period between December 1940 and May 1945, during the German occupation of Norway. In 1946 he was appointed to serve at the International Court of Justice, which he presided from 1958 until retiring in 1961.

Klæstad was also active as a composer.

References

1885 births
1965 deaths
Supreme Court of Norway justices
Norwegian composers
Norwegian male composers
People from Levanger
Presidents of the International Court of Justice
Norwegian officials of the United Nations
Norwegian judges of United Nations courts and tribunals
20th-century Norwegian male musicians